is a railway station in Hyūga, Miyazaki, Japan.

Lines

Layout 
The station consists of a side platform serving a single track at grade. The station building is a simple functional wooden shed structure which houses a staffed ticket window and a bench. A bike shed and limited parking are provided at the station forecourt.

The station is not staffed by JR Kyushu but some types of tickets are available from a kan'i itaku agent who staffs the ticket window.

Adjacent stations

History
JR Kyushu opened the station on 11 March 1989 as an additional station on the existing track of the Nippō Main Line.

Passenger statistics
In fiscal 2016, the station was used by an average of 265 passengers (boarding only) per day.

See also
List of railway stations in Japan

References

External links 

Zaikōji (JR Kyushu)

Railway stations in Miyazaki Prefecture
Railway stations in Japan opened in 1989